The prime minister of Jordan is the head of government of the Hashemite Kingdom of Jordan.  

The prime minister is appointed by the king of Jordan, who is then free to form his own Cabinet. The Parliament of Jordan then approves the programs of the new government through a vote of confidence. There are no constitutional limits on a prime minister's term, and several of them served multiple non-consecutive terms.

Prime Ministry of Jordan 
The Prime Ministry is the central agency of the Government of Jordan which acts as the secretariat to the Prime Minister.

List of prime ministers

See also
Politics of Jordan

References

1946 establishments in Jordan
Politics of Jordan
Government of Jordan
Prime Ministry of Jordan